This is a list of golf courses for the design of which American golf course architect A. W. Tillinghast was at least in part responsible.  

OD denotes courses for which Tillinghast is the original designer
R denotes courses reconstructed by Tillinghast
A denotes courses for which Tillinghast made substantial additions
E denotes courses that Tillinghast examined and on the construction of which he consulted

References

External links
The Tillinghast Association official site

Tillighast